Oniel Wilson (born 27 April 1971) is an Indian former cricketer. He played two first-class matches for Delhi between 1990 and 1997.

See also
 List of Delhi cricketers

References

External links
 

1971 births
Living people
Indian cricketers
Delhi cricketers
Cricketers from Delhi